Nouran Elmagghauri Sharaf (born ) is an Egyptian retired volleyball player. She played for the Egypt women's national volleyball team.

She participated in the 2003 FIVB Volleyball Women's World Cup.
On club level she played for Ahly, Cairo, EGY in 2003.

References

External links

1985 births
Living people
Egyptian women's volleyball players
Place of birth missing (living people)